The Bangladesh cricket team toured Zimbabwe in July and August 2022 to play three One Day International (ODI) and three Twenty20 International (T20I) matches. The original tour schedule was for two Test matches and three ODIs, but the Test matches were replaced by the T20I fixtures. All the matches took place at the Harare Sports Club. Prior to the series, the Bangladesh Cricket Board (BCB) named Nurul Hasan as their T20I captain for the tour, after Mahmudullah lacked performance and results. However, Nurul suffered a finger injury during the second T20I match and was ruled out of the rest of the tour. The BCB named Mosaddek Hossain as the team's captain for the third T20I match.

Zimbabwe won the opening T20I match by 17 runs. It was the team's sixth-consecutive win in T20Is, their best in the format. Bangladesh won the second T20I by seven wickets to level the series. Mosaddek Hossain took five wickets for 20 runs, the joint second-best bowling figures for Bangladesh in a T20I match. Zimbabwe won the third T20I by 10 runs to win the series by 2–1 margin, which was their first T20I series win against Bangladesh.

In the first ODI, Bangladesh scored 303 losing 2 wickets with their top four batters scoring fifties. In reply, Zimbabwe chased down the total with 10 balls to spare with the help of centuries from Innocent Kaia (110) and Sikandar Raza (135*). This was their joint-third highest successful run chase in ODIs. It was their first win against Bangladesh since 8 May 2013 ending their 19 successive defeats streak against Bangladesh. The 192-run stand between Innocent Kaia and Sikandar Raza for the fourth wicket was their highest partnership for any wicket against Bangladesh as well as their fourth highest partnership for any wicket.
In the second ODI, Batting first, Bangladesh managed 290 runs in 50 overs. In reply, Zimbabwe lost four wickets in quick succession. But, the 201-run stand between Sikandar Raza and Regis Chakabva helped their side to win the match by 5 wickets, and Zimbabwe took an unassailable lead of 2–0 in the series. In the process, Raza scored back-to-back centuries in this ODI series and Chakabva scored his maiden ODI century off 73 balls, the fastest century by a Zimbabwean batter.
In the third ODI, Bangladesh could only manage 256 with the help of two half-centuries from Anamul Haque and Afif Hossain. In reply, Zimbabwe kept losing wickets at regular intervals and they were reduced to 83/9. But the 68-run stand between Richard Ngarava and Victor Nyauchi helped them to reduce the defeat margin before they were bowled out on 151 and Bangladesh won the match comprehensively by 105 runs. Eventually, Zimbabwe won the ODI series by 2–1 margin.

Squads

Bangladesh's Nurul Hasan suffered a finger injury during the second T20I match and was ruled out of the rest of the tour. Mosaddek Hossain was named as the T20I captain for the third match, with Mahmudullah added to Bangladesh's T20I squad in place of Nurul Hasan. Before the first ODI, Craig Ervine was ruled out of the series due to hamstring and knee injury and Regis Chakabva was named as the captain for the ODI series. Sean Williams was also granted leave from the ODI series due to personal reasons. Brad Evans was added to the Zimbabwe's squad in place of the injured Tendai Chatara. Litton Das and Shoriful Islam suffered injuries during the first ODI and were replaced by Mohammad Naim and Ebadot Hossain respectively.

T20I series

1st T20I

2nd T20I

3rd T20I

ODI series

1st ODI

2nd ODI

3rd ODI

Notes

References

External links
 Series home at ESPN Cricinfo

2022 in Bangladeshi cricket
2022 in Zimbabwean cricket
International cricket competitions in 2022
Bangladeshi cricket tours of Zimbabwe